Victoria Azarenka and Aryna Sabalenka defeated Nicole Melichar and Demi Schuurs in the final, 4–6, 7–5, [10–4], to win the doubles tennis title at the 2021 WTA German Open. It marked Azarenka's ninth career WTA Tour doubles title and Sabalenka's sixth.

Cara Black and Liezel Huber were the defending champions from when the tournament was last held in 2008, but both players had retired from professional tennis before the tournament's relaunch. As the inaugural edition of the tournament following its relaunch, this marked the first year the tournament was played on grass.

Seeds

Draw

Draw

References

External links
Main Draw

WTA German Open - Doubles
2021 Doubles